80 Million is a 2011 Polish drama film directed by Waldemar Krzystek. The film was selected as the Polish entry for the Best Foreign Language Oscar at the 85th Academy Awards, but it did not make the final shortlist. It is about Polish activists who withdrew 80 million zlotys from Solidarity's accounts hours before the accounts were blocked by martial law in Poland in December 1981. This helped organize Solidarity’s underground activities for years.

Cast
 Filip Bobek as Władysław Frasyniuk
 Marcin Bosak as Maks
 Wojciech Solarz as Staszek
 Piotr Głowacki as Sobczak
 Sonia Bohosiewicz as Czerniak
 Olga Frycz as Marta
 Krzysztof Czeczot as Józek
 Maciej Makowski as Piotr
 Mariusz Benoit as Stary
 Jan Frycz as Baginski
 Krzysztof Stroiński as Zegota
 Przemyslaw Bluszcz as Bogdan Stroinski
 Agnieszka Grochowska as Anka

Reception
In a review for The Hollywood Reporter, Stephen Dalton calls the film a "rousing heist thriller" and "an enjoyably upbeat thrill ride and a universal celebration of victory over tyranny".

See also
 List of submissions to the 85th Academy Awards for Best Foreign Language Film
 List of Polish submissions for the Academy Award for Best Foreign Language Film
 Heist film

References

External links
 

2011 films
2011 drama films
Polish drama films
2010s Polish-language films
Films directed by Waldemar Krzystek
Films set in 1981